Tor hemispinus is a species of cyprinid of the genus Tor. Described in 1985, it has been classified as "data deficient" on the IUCN Red List.

References

Cyprinid fish of Asia
Freshwater fish of China
Fish described in 1985